The somatostatin family is a protein family with somatostatin as titular member, a hormone which inhibits the release of the pituitary somatotropin (growth hormone) and inhibits the release of glucagon and insulin from the pancreas of fasted animals. Cortistatin is a cortical neuropeptide with neuronal depressant and sleep-modulating properties.

Human proteins from this family 

 Cortistatin (CORT)
 Somatostatin (SST)

References

Protein domains
Hormones